Myeong-dong Station is a station on the Seoul Subway Line 4. This station is located in Jung-gu, Seoul.

Station layout

Neighborhood 
 Myeongdong, a shopping district, famous for its brand stores, department stores and street food stalls.
 Migliore
 Seoul Animation Center
 N Seoul Tower

References

Seoul Metropolitan Subway stations
Metro stations in Jung District, Seoul
Railway stations in South Korea opened in 1985